Julussdalen is a small valley in Innlandet county, Norway. There are scattered settlements in the valley, especially in the lower part in Elverum. Julussdalen has many historic farms with cabins, mills, and mountain pastures.

Location

Geography
Julussdalen was very important for timber out of the big forests, dating from around the mid-16th century.

Etymology
Julussdalen is named after the river Julussa. The first part of the name "Juluss" is most likely derived from a Norwegian dialect word that means "silent", and the last part "dalen" is the Norwegian word for "valley". Julussdalen means most likely "the quiet valley" or "the valley of silence".

References

Valleys of Innlandet
Åmot
Elverum